"They're Here" is a song by British band EMF from their second album, Stigma. It reached number 29 on the UK Singles Chart.

Track listings
CDR 6321 (CD)
 "They're Here" (album version) 
 "Phantasmagoric"
 "The Low Spark of High Heeled Boys"

R 6321 (7-inch)
 "They're Here" (album version) 
 "Phantasmagoric"

12R 6321 (12-inch)
 "They're Here" (Cenobite mix)
 "They're Here" (Mosh mix)
 "Phantasmagoric"

References

1992 singles
1992 songs
EMF (band) songs
EMI Records singles